Covington Historic District may refer to:

Covington Historic District (Covington, Georgia), listed on the NRHP in Georgia
Covington Mills and Mill Village Historic District, Covington, Georgia, listed on the NRHP in Georgia
North Covington Historic District, Covington, Georgia, listed on the NRHP in Georgia
Covington Downtown Commercial Historic District, Covington, Kentucky, listed on the NRHP in Kentucky
Division of St. John Historic District, Covington, Louisiana, also known as "Covington Historic District", NRHP-listed in St. Tammany Parish
Covington Historic District (Covington, Virginia), listed on the NRHP in Virginia